Sphaeradenia is a genus of plant in family Cyclanthaceae, first described as a genus in 1954. It is native to Central America and South America.

 Species

References

 
Pandanales genera
Taxonomy articles created by Polbot